Teams made up of athletes representing different National Olympic Committees (NOCs), called mixed-NOCs teams, participated in the 2014 Summer Youth Olympics. These teams participated in either events composed entirely of mixed-NOCs teams, or in events which saw the participation of mixed-NOCs teams and non-mixed-NOCs teams. When a mixed-NOCs team won a medal, the Olympic flag was raised rather than a national flag; if a mixed-NOCs team won gold, the Olympic anthem would be played instead of national anthems. A total of 17 events with Mixed NOCs were held.

Background 
The concept of mixed-NOCs was introduced in the 2010 Summer Youth Olympics, in which athletes from different nations would compete in the same team, often representing their continent. This is in contrast to the Mixed team (IOC code: ZZX) found at early senior Olympic Games.

Medal summary 
The following medal summary lists all nations whose athletes won a medal while competing for a mixed-NOCs team. If there is more than one athlete from the same nation on a medal-winning team, only one medal of that colour is credited. The summary shows how many events at which a nation had an athlete in a medal-winning mixed-NOCs team.

Archery

Athletes were paired off based on their performance during the ranking round of their respective individual events. For example, the 1st ranked boy was paired with the 32nd ranked girl and the 2nd ranked boy was paired with the 31st ranked girl and so on.

Athletics

Badminton

Each doubles pair was determine through a draw where an athlete of one gender seeded 1-16 was paired with another athlete seeded 17-32 of the opposite gender.

Cycling

NOCs who qualified only two men or women lots were drawn to form combined teams.

Diving

Equestrian

Athletes were grouped based on their continental origins. For continents with not enough athletes riders from nearby continents were used (e.g. Ecuador for North America and Hong Kong, Iran and Malaysia for Australasia).

Fencing

Nine continental teams were created containing athletes from both genders and all three weapons. Athletes were chosen for each team based on their performance from the individual events. For example, the top ranked athletes from Asia-Oceania in each event were grouped into Asia-Oceania 1 while the second highest ranked athletes from that continent were placed into Asia-Oceania 2.

Golf

Initially golf was to not have mixed NOC entrants, however, two teams of mixed nations were created due to not having a partner from their own nation.

Judo

13 teams were created and named after judo legends. Teams of 7 or 8 athletes were made by categorizing all athletes by weight and drawing one athlete from each weight group. Other considerations in the draw were medalists were to be evenly separated among all teams and no two athletes from the same nation were on the same team.

Modern pentathlon

Shooting

Table tennis

Athletes from nations that were unable to create a team by themselves were first paired off by continent and then intercontinental. The highest ranked boy from one continent was paired with the highest ranked girl from the same continent and so on.

Tennis

Athletes from nations that were unable to create a doubles team by themselves were first paired off by region, then zone and then intercontinental. The highest ranked boy from one area was paired with the highest ranked girl from the same area and so on.

Triathlon

Based on their performance from the individual events athletes were grouped together by continent while the remaining athletes were grouped together as intercontinental teams. For example, the top two ranked boys and top two girls from Europe were grouped together as Europe 1 while the next two ranked boys and next two ranked girls from Europe were grouped together as Europe 2 and so on.

See also
 2014 Summer Youth Olympics medal table
 Mixed-NOCs at the Youth Olympics

References

2014 Summer Youth Olympics
Mixed teams at the Youth Olympics